Pierre "Pig's Eye" Parrant, or Pierre Parent, was the first person of European descent to live within the borders of what would eventually become the city of Saint Paul, Minnesota. His exploits propelled him to local fame and infamy, with his name briefly adorning the village that would one day become Minnesota's capital city.

History 
Sources disagree about Parrant's exact history before settling in the Minnesota Territory, but most indicate that he was of French Canadian origin (or perhaps Métis) and born near Sault Ste. Marie, Ontario, around 1777. For most of his adult life Parrant made his living as a fur trapper while working for a company called McKenzie and Chouteau. During his days as a fur trapper "Pig's Eye" Parrant, so called because he was blind in one eye, started to gain a somewhat dubious reputation with law enforcement, most likely due to his dabbling as a bootlegger. With the onset of age and the fur trade's decline Parrant began seeking new endeavors to earn a living. His search brought him to a fledgling new settlement near a military outpost called Fort Snelling in the Minnesota Territory.

Pierre Parrant in Minnesota 

Arriving at Mendota in 1832, Parrant began to carve out a new life for himself while residing in a squatter's colony near Fort Snelling. His new career found him distilling liquor, which he sold to other squatters, the indigenous people of the area, and even the soldiers at the fort. This new business served "Pig's Eye" (French: L'Œil de Cochon) until 1838, when the squatters were forced off the land surrounding the fort due to their strain on surrounding resources. It was at this time that the 60+-year-old Parrant made a claim on a tract of land at the entrance of what was known as Fountain Cave. This cave was situated on the east bank of the Mississippi River just upstream from what is now Downtown Saint Paul. Then, around June 1, 1838, Parrant completed a small shack that, according to an 1892 publication by Albert A. Jones, became "the first habitation, and the first business house of Saint Paul." Thus Parrant became the first inhabitant of the future city of Saint Paul. That such a distinction belongs to a man with Parrant's reputation has irked some historians, such as J. Fletcher Williams, who lamented:
Such was the man on whom Fortune, with that blind fatuity that seems to characterize the jade, thrust the honor of being the founder of our good city!  Our pride almost revolts at the chronicling of such a humiliation, and leads us to wish that it were on one worthier and nobler that such a distinction had fallen.  But history is inexorable, and we must record facts as they are.

Fountain Cave was an excellent location for Parrant's claim, as the spring inside it provided a steady water supply for his still. It was at Fountain Cave that Parrant opened a tavern that became wildly popular with the surrounding community. The bar, known as "Pig's Eye" or "Pig's Eye Pandemonium", was easily accessible to local residents, riverboat crews working on the river, and the soldiers from nearby Fort Snelling. Parrant had become so popular, in fact, that when a nearby resident named Joseph R. Brown sent a letter to a friend in 1839 he gave the return address simply as "Pig's Eye." Not long after, Brown received correspondence at the address he had given. As a result, the growing community around Pierre's bar became known as "Pig's Eye." The city's name might have remained Pig's Eye had it not been for the arrival of a Catholic priest named Lucien Galtier. So aghast was Galtier that the village on the river derived its name from a man of such ill repute that, when he built his small chapel in the area in 1841, he reportedly stated, "Pig's Eye, converted thou shalt be, like Saul; Arise, and be, henceforth, Saint Paul!" It is disputed whether Galtier actually said those words, but the story is part of the city's folklore.

In 1844, Parrant lost his claim at Fountain Cave and was forced to vacate the land. It is not clear why. Some sources indicate that he was involved in a border dispute with a neighbor; others say he was forced to sell his claim because of mounting debts.

Life after Saint Paul 
What happened to Parrant after he left Saint Paul is mysterious. Some sources say he was so upset about losing his claim that he decided to leave the Minnesota area and return to Sault Ste. Marie, only to die along the way in 1844. Others say he eventually settled near Winnipeg, Manitoba, Canada, where he died between 1872 and 1886. The latter account is unlikely since it would mean he lived to be 100, which was extremely rare at that time.

See also 
 History of Saint Paul, Minnesota
 History of Minnesota

References 

History of Saint Paul, Minnesota
Minnesota folklore
People from Saint Paul, Minnesota
Pre-statehood history of Minnesota
People from Fort Snelling, Minnesota
Bootleggers